The List of railway routes in Schleswig-Holstein provides a list of all railway routes in Schleswig-Holstein, Germany. This includes Intercity-Express, Intercity, Regional-Express, Regionalbahn and S-Bahn services. The information is up to date to September 2019.

Regional services
The following Regional-Express and Regionalbahn services run through Schleswig-Holstein:

See also 
List of scheduled railway routes in Germany

References

External links 
kursbuch.bahn.de Timetables for all railway routes in Germany

Schleswig-Holstein
Transport in Schleswig-Holstein
Schleswig-Holstein-related lists
Schleswig-Holstein